Villa Hortensia is a mansion in the city of Rosario, province of Santa Fe, Argentina. It is located on 1917 Warnes St. in Barrio Alberdi, in the north-eastern part of Rosario. It was built in 1890 by architect Boyd Walker for José Nicolás Puccio, founder of Alberdi. It was then sold to Ciro Echesortu, and then in turn to Alfredo Rouillon, married to María Hortensia Echesortu (from whom the house got its name). The wealthy Rouillon family employed Villa Hortensia as a summer residence, taking advantage of its proximity to the Paraná River and its large, tree-shadowed gardens.

Maintenance of the mansion was neglected until, in 1989, it was declared a National Historic Monument. At the time it was under a serious threat of being condemned. The Villa was acquired by the Municipality of Rosario on 30 May 1996 in order to transform it into an administrative center, as part of an official decentralisation plan. Villa Hortensia was restored, emphasizing the original plans and materials, and was re-opened as the first Municipal District Center on 13 October 1997.

Villa Hortensia hosts a citizen assistance office, a delegation of the Municipal Bank of Rosario, and offices of the water, natural gas and power companies, where the neighbors of the North District can pay for these services, place requests, etc. The mansion also has a marriage office. This allows for citizens to carry out administrative business near their homes, instead of travelling downtown to the main municipal offices (a 40-minute bus ride). A survey conducted a month after the inauguration of Villa Hortensia found that the citizens of the North District used to travel an average of 8 km for administrative business before, a distance which has been reduced to only 1.5 km. Eighty percent of the citizens surveyed also consider the service in Villa Hortensia better than the one formerly provided in the downtown offices.

Sources

  Municipality of Rosario - Information on the North District Municipal Center.
  Rosario.com.ar - Directions and a location map for Villa Hortensia.
  Villa Hortensia, un palacio del siglo XIX. Tourism Office of Rosario.
  Ciudades para un futuro más sostenible. Descentralización y transformación estructural en Rosario (Argentina). 5 July 2000.

See also
 Districts of Rosario, with an overview of the city's decentralisation plan and the Municipal District Centers.

Buildings and structures in Rosario, Santa Fe
National Historic Monuments of Argentina
Residential buildings completed in 1890